The ambassador of the Netherlands to the United States is the official representative of the government of the Netherlands to the government of the United States.

List of representatives

References 

 
United States
Netherlands